UFC on Fuel TV: Mousasi vs. Latifi (also known as UFC on Fuel TV 9 or UFC Sweden 2) was a mixed martial arts event held on April 6, 2013, at the Ericsson Globe Arena in Stockholm, Sweden.  The event was broadcast live on Fuel TV.

Background
This event was the second event that the UFC has hosted in Sweden, following UFC on Fuel TV: Gustafsson vs. Silva which took place in 2012, and was the fastest selling European event in UFC history, selling out in just three hours, partly due to alleged involvement from ticket re-sellers.

The event was expected to be headlined by top light heavyweight contender Alexander Gustafsson and former Dream Middleweight and Light Heavyweight Champion and former Strikeforce Light Heavyweight Champion, and promotional newcomer Gegard Mousasi.  However, on April 2 it was announced by the Swedish MMA Federation, that Gustafsson would not be cleared to participate at the event due to a cut he received during a sparring session on March 30.  Gustafsson was replaced by UFC newcomer Ilir Latifi, one of his main training partners.  The main event was also contested at three rounds, instead of the organization's customary five.

A bout between Robbie Peralta and Akira Corassani, previously linked to UFC 156, was moved to this event after an illness sidelined Corassani for a short period of time.

This card featured the UFC debut of Conor McGregor.

Results

Bonus awards
Fighters were awarded $60,000 bonuses.
 Fight of the Night: Brad Pickett vs. Mike Easton
 Knockout of  the Night: Conor McGregor
 Submission of the Night: Reza Madadi

See also

List of UFC events
2013 in UFC

References

External links
Official UFC past events page
UFC events results at Sherdog.com

UFC on Fuel TV
2013 in mixed martial arts
Mixed martial arts in Sweden
Sport in Stockholm
2013 in Swedish sport
2010s in Stockholm